Desaparecido is a Spanish word that means disappeared. It may refer to:

 A person who is abducted by a state or political organization, followed by a refusal to acknowledge the person's fate and whereabouts; see Forced disappearance
 Desaparecido (album), a 1985 album by Italian rock band Litfiba
 "Desaparecido", a Manu Chao song on the 1998 Clandestino album

See also
 Desaparecidos (disambiguation)
 Desaparecida